The 2019 Australian Open described in detail, in the form of day-by-day summaries.

All dates are AEDT (UTC+11).

Day 1 (14 January)
 Seeds out:
 Men's Singles:  John Isner [9],  Kyle Edmund [13],  Steve Johnson [31]
 Women's Singles:  Julia Görges [14],  Jeļena Ostapenko [22],  Barbora Strýcová [32]
 Schedule of Play

Day 2 (15 January)
 Seeds out:
 Men's Singles:  Marco Cecchinato [17]
 Women's Singles:  Daria Kasatkina [10],  Mihaela Buzărnescu [25],  Dominika Cibulková [26]
 Schedule of Play

Day 3 (16 January)
 Seeds out:
 Men's Singles:  Kevin Anderson [5],  Gaël Monfils [30]
 Women's Singles:  Kiki Bertens [9],  Anett Kontaveit [20],  Lesia Tsurenko [24],  Donna Vekić [29]
 Men's Doubles:  Jean-Julien Rojer /  Horia Tecău [9],  Feliciano López /  Marc López [14],  Rohan Bopanna /  Divij Sharan [15],  Robin Haase /  Matwé Middelkoop [16]
 Women's Doubles:  Anna-Lena Grönefeld /  Vania King [12],  Miyu Kato /  Makoto Ninomiya [14]
 Schedule of Play

Day 4 (17 January)
History was created when Garbiñe Muguruza and Johanna Konta played out a three-set thriller which ended at 3.12 am. It was the latest start of a match in the history of the Australian Open, with play starting at 12.30 am after Alexander Zverev's marathon win.

Seeds out:
Men's Singles:  Dominic Thiem [7],  Chung Hyeon [24],  Gilles Simon [29],  Philipp Kohlschreiber [32]
Women's Singles:  Carla Suárez Navarro [23]
Men's Doubles:  Juan Sebastián Cabal /  Robert Farah [2],  Ben McLachlan /  Jan-Lennard Struff [8]
Women's Doubles:  Gabriela Dabrowski /  Xu Yifan [3],  Bethanie Mattek-Sands /  Demi Schuurs [15],  Peng Shuai /  Yang Zhaoxuan [16]
Schedule of Play

Day 5 (18 January)
 Seeds out:
 Men's Singles:  Diego Schwartzman [18],  Nikoloz Basilashvili [19],  Fernando Verdasco [26],  Alex de Minaur [27]
 Women's Singles:  Caroline Wozniacki [3],  Aryna Sabalenka [11],  Caroline Garcia [19],  Petra Martić [31] 
 Men's Doubles:  Oliver Marach /  Mate Pavić [1],   Ivan Dodig /  Édouard Roger-Vasselin [13]
 Women's Doubles:  Lucie Hradecká /  Ekaterina Makarova [6],  Hsieh Su-wei /  Abigail Spears [8]
 Mixed Doubles: 
 Schedule of Play

Day 6 (19 January) 
 Seeds out:
 Men's Singles:  Fabio Fognini [12],  David Goffin [21],  Denis Shapovalov [25]
 Women's Singles:  Elise Mertens [12],  Wang Qiang [21],  Camila Giorgi [27],  Hsieh Su-wei [28]
 Men's Doubles:  Dominic Inglot /  Franko Škugor [10]
 Women's Doubles:  Irina-Camelia Begu /  Mihaela Buzărnescu   [10],  Eri Hozumi /  Alicja Rosolska [11]
 Mixed Doubles:  Makoto Ninomiya /  Ben McLachlan [7],  Ekaterina Makarova /  Artem Sitak [8]
 Schedule of Play

Day 7 (20 January) 
 Seeds out:
Men's Singles:  Roger Federer [3],  Marin Čilić [6],  Grigor Dimitrov [20]
 Women's Singles:  Angelique Kerber [2],  Sloane Stephens [5],  Maria Sharapova [30]
 Mixed Doubles:  Mihaela Buzărnescu /  Oliver Marach [4]
Schedule of Play

Day 8 (21 January) 
 Seeds out:
Men's Singles:  Alexander Zverev [4],  Borna Ćorić [11],  Daniil Medvedev [15],  Pablo Carreño Busta [23] 
 Women's Singles:  Simona Halep [1],  Anastasija Sevastova [13],  Madison Keys [17],  Garbiñe Muguruza [18]
 Men's Doubles:  Rajeev Ram /  Joe Salisbury [11]
 Women's Doubles:  Nicole Melichar /  Květa Peschke [4],  Kirsten Flipkens /  Johanna Larsson [13]
 Schedule of Play

Day 9 (22 January) 
 Seeds out:
 Men's Singles:  Roberto Bautista Agut [22] 
 Women's Singles:  Ashleigh Barty [15]
 Men's Doubles:  Raven Klaasen /  Michael Venus [6]
 Women's Doubles:  Barbora Krejčíková /  Kateřina Siniaková  [1],  Andreja Klepač /  María José Martínez Sánchez [5],  Chan Hao-ching /  Latisha Chan [7],  Raquel Atawo /  Katarina Srebotnik [9]
 Schedule of Play

Day 10 (23 January)
 Seeds out:
 Men's Singles:  Kei Nishikori [8],  Milos Raonic [16]
 Women's Singles:  Elina Svitolina [6],  Serena Williams [16] 
 Men's Doubles:  Jamie Murray /  Bruno Soares [3],  Bob Bryan /  Mike Bryan [4],  Łukasz Kubot /  Horacio Zeballos [7]
 Mixed Doubles:  Gabriela Dabrowski /  Mate Pavić [1],  Anna-Lena Grönefeld /  Robert Farah [5],   Abigail Spears /  Juan Sebastián Cabal [6]
 Schedule of Play

Day 11 (24 January)
 Seeds out:
 Men's Singles:  Stefanos Tsitsipas [14]
 Women's Singles:  Karolína Plíšková [7]
 Mixed Doubles:  Nicole Melichar /  Bruno Soares [2]
 Schedule of Play

Day 12 (25 January)
 Seeds out:
 Men's Singles:  Lucas Pouille [28]
 Women's Doubles:  Tímea Babos /  Kristina Mladenovic [2]
 Schedule of Play

Day 13 (26 January)
 Seeds out:
 Women's Singles:  Petra Kvitová [8]
 Schedule of Play

Day 14 (27 January)
 Seeds out:
 Men's Singles:  Rafael Nadal [2]
 Men's Doubles:  Henri Kontinen /  John Peers [12]
 Schedule of Play

References

Day-by-day summaries
Australian Open (tennis) by year – Day-by-day summaries